The 1969 British Sports Car Championship was the sixth season of the British Sports Car Championship. With exception of the Brands Hatch 6 Hours, all races were won by a Lola T70 Mk.3/Mk.3B.

The championship was won by John Lepp driving a Chevron B8.

Results

Races in bold, were also rounds of the International Championship for Makes.

References

British Sports Car Championship
Sports Car